Capo Grosso Lighthouse is an active lighthouse on the Levanzo Island placed at the extremity of Capo Grosso, the northernmost point of the Island.

Description
The lighthouse was built in 1858 in concrete and has a cylindrical shape with balcony and lantern atop a 1-storey keeper's house.

The keeper's house is no longer inhabited and it is in ruin; on October 12, 2015, the Agenzia del Demanio, who run the State ownership buildings, decided to give it in concession to private. The lighthouse has been awarded to a company that deals with investments in the Hotel sector with the intention of transforming the keeper's house  in a six-room resort.

See also
 List of lighthouses in Italy

References

External links
 Servizio Fari Marina Militare 

Lighthouses in Italy